"Beauty and a Beat" is a song by Canadian singer Justin Bieber from his third studio album Believe (2012). It features rapper Nicki Minaj, who co-wrote it with Savan Kotecha, Max Martin and Zedd. It was also produced by the latter two with a heavy drum machine and "rushing" synthesizers. Lyrically, it speaks about Bieber wanting to take his love interest to a club, where they can "party like it's 3012". It is the only song from Believe that Bieber did not co-write. The song became the third official single from the album.

Following the release of Believe, "Beauty and a Beat" debuted on the US Billboard Hot 100 at 72 due to strong digital downloads. After the release of the song's music video, it re-entered the Hot 100 at number 72 and peaked at 5. It also debuted on the Canadian Hot 100 at 47.

Background
"Beauty and a Beat" was originally written by Anton Zaslavski for his debut album, Clarity. Zaslavski, however, felt the song did not quite fit his new album's style, so he, Max Martin, Savan Kotecha, and Onika Maraj wrote a version for Bieber's third studio album, Believe released in 2012. Maraj, known by her stage-name Nicki Minaj, provides guest vocals on the track. Bieber later spoke upon the collaboration with Minaj, saying: "I wanted a female rapper and I think that she is the best choice. I felt she just fit on the song perfectly." An album of remixes was released on December 11, 2012.

Composition and lyrics

"Beauty and a Beat" is an uptempo EDM and electropop song that lasts 3 minutes and 48 seconds. With the chord progression of F–Dm7–Am–Gsus, the song is written in the key of A minor in common time. The song moves at a tempo of 128 beats per minute.

The song contains elements of R&B. Sarah Deen of Metro described it as a "frantic dance track", while Rolling Stone'''s Jon Dolan called the song a "disco-inferno". "Beauty and a Beat" contains fast-paced drum beats and an acid house break down. Bieber's then-girlfriend Selena Gomez is referenced in the song during Minaj's rap: "Justin Bieber/You know I'm gonna hit 'em with the ether/Buns out, wiener/But I gotta keep an eye out for Selener." Reviewer Jason Lipshutz noted the rhyme between "wiener" and her given name.

Critical reception
The song was met with mixed reviews. Many contemporary critics praised Bieber's attempt to reach an audience not usually interested in his music, while others criticized its lyrics and Minaj's rap. Andy Gill of The Independent listed the song in his "Download" category during an album review for Believe. Laura Sassano commented on the song upon its leak, saying: "The new song continues Justin's quest to grow up and be taken more seriously as an artist". Becca Longmire of Entertainmentwise felt that the song was impressive; she also compared this with Bieber's previous single "Baby".

Music video
The music video was released on October 12, 2012 on Bieber's YouTube channel. According to the video's storyline, in October 2012, 3 hours of personal footage was stolen from Justin. The story continues, this footage was then illegally uploaded by an anonymous blogger. It starts with a short montage of video clips, and heads into a party at a waterpark featuring dancers, and Nicki Minaj rapping beside Justin in a pool. The video ends with Justin sliding down a waterslide. A gameplay clip of Good Feeling by Flo Rida from Just Dance 4'' was featured.

Bieber wrote the video's storyline himself and co-directed the video itself with Jon Chu. All of the waterpark footage was shot on scene at Raging Waters in San Dimas, a suburb of Los Angeles. Most of the clip was recorded on a GoPro Hero 2 by Bieber, with some footage shots on the Olympus Tough TG-1. As of May 2022, the music video had received more than 1 billion views.

Live performances
Bieber performed the song for the first time at the American Music Awards with Minaj. Since then, Minaj has rapped her verse on select dates of her Pink Friday: Reloaded Tour. Bieber also performed the song at the 2012 Victoria's Secret Fashion Show and the 2015 Wango Tango.

Track listing

Charts

Weekly charts

Year-end charts

Certifications

Release

The song was released on October 12, 2012 on the video-sharing website YouTube.

Release history

See also
 List of best-selling singles in Australia
 List of number-one dance singles of 2013 (U.S.)

References

2012 singles
2012 songs
Justin Bieber songs
Songs written by Nicki Minaj
Nicki Minaj songs
Electropop songs
Electronic dance music songs
Songs written by Savan Kotecha
Song recordings produced by Max Martin
Songs written by Max Martin
Songs written by Zedd